The 2000 Arab Club Champions Cup in association football was played in Saudi Arabia in the city of Jeddah. CS Sfaxien won the championship for the first time beating in the final Al-Jaish.

Participants

Preliminary round

Zone 1 (Gulf Area)
Qualification from GCC Champions League held in Kuwait City in 2000.

Al-Hilal withdrew. Al-Muharraq & Al-Qadsia advanced to the final tournament.

Zone 2 (Red Sea)
Al Ahly withdrew.

Al-Hilal Club advanced to the final tournament.

Zone 3 (North Africa)
Originally two teams to qualify.

All teams CR Belouizdad, Kawkab Marrakech and CS Sfaxien advanced to the final tournament.

Zone 4 (East Region)
Qualifying tournament held in Amman, Jordan. Khadamat Rafah withdrew.

All teams Al-Faisaly and Al-Jaish advanced to the final tournament.

Final tournament

Group stage
The eight teams were drawn into two groups of four. Each group was played on one leg basis. The winners and runners-up of each group advanced to the semi-finals.
Al Shabab withdrew from the tournament, Al-Ahli qualified as hosts.

Group A

Group B

Knockout stage

Semi-finals

Final

Winners

References

External links
15th Arab Club Champions Cup 2000 – rsssf.com

2000
2000 in African football
2000 in Asian football
International association football competitions hosted by Saudi Arabia